Zee Café is an Indian pay television channel owned by Zee Entertainment Enterprises. The channel mainly syndicates popular American and British television shows to appeal to the English-speaking population of India.

History

Zee English was launched in the Indian subcontinent on 15 March 2000, as competition to Star World. Initially free-to-air, the channel was later encrypted as part of the Zee pay-television bouquet.

The channel underwent a rebranding on 28 March 2005 and was renamed as Zee Café, along with a new logo and promotion deals.

The channel's high-definition feed was launched on 23 September 2015, for a bench test in limited markets and nationwide on 21 November 2015.

International distribution
Zee Café launched on Sky in the United Kingdom and Ireland on 15 July 2010. The channel originally served as the Zee's network hybrid channel, used to broadcast shows from a number of its existing channels in India.

On 11 September 2012, it was repositioned as a classics channel, airing re-runs of old Zee TV programming, covering cookery, dramas, horror and mythology. At the same time the channel became free-to-air.

On 10 June 2013, Zee Café UK was replaced by Zee Lamhe, another free-to-air classics channel from Zee.

Programming

Current programming

Anime 
 Marvel Anime Blade
 Marvel Anime Iron Man
 Marvel Anime Wolverine
 Valkyria Chronicles

Drama 
A Million Little Things
Charmed
City on a Hill
Dexter
Dynasty
Evil
FBI
The Good Fight
Grey's Anatomy
L.A.'s Finest
Magnum P.I.
McMafia
Nancy Drew
Our Girl
Riverdale
SEAL Team

Reality 
American Idol
Love Island UK
MasterChef Australia
The Drew Barrymore Show
The Late Late Show with James Corden
World of Dance

Science Fiction 
BattleBots
Star Trek: Discovery
The 100

Sitcom 
Community
Our Cartoon President
The Unicorn

Sports 
The Titan Games

Superheroes 
Supergirl

Former programming

Comedy-Drama 
A Very English Scandal
The Carrie Diaries
The Catch
Hart of Dixie
Make It or Break It
The Mind of the Married Man
The Mysteries of Laura
No Tomorrow
Pushing Daisies
Red Band Society
Togetherness
Ugly Betty
Weeds

Drama 
Agatha Christie's Poirot
Agent X
American Crime
Army Wives
The Arrangement
The Assets
The Astronaut Wives Club
Believe
Beyond
Body of Proof
Born to Kill
Broken
Central Park West
Cloak & Dagger
Code Black
The Collection
Criminal Minds
Criminal Minds: Beyond Borders
Criminal Minds: Beyond Boundaries 
Doctor Foster
ER
Eye Candy
Famous in Love
The First
Fleming: The Man Who Would Be Bond
The Following
The Fosters
From Darkness
The Fugitive
Gilmore Girls
The Good Wife
Gossip Girl
Gotham
Guerrilla
Haven
Hostages
House of Cards
Huge
Inhumans
In the Dark
The Kettering Incident
Kung Fu
La Femme Nikita
Les Misérables
Lethal Weapon
Lost
The Loudest Voice
Maigret
The Mentalist
Mistresses
MotherFatherSon
Murder in the First
New Blood
The Night Manager
No Ordinary Family
The Originals
The O.C.
Oz
Paula
Penny Dreadful
Penny Dreadful: City of Angels
Perception
Press
Pretty Little Liars
Raising the Bar
Recovery Road
Reign
Renegade
Resurrection
Rizzoli & Isles
Rookie Blue
Runaways
Rush Hour
Scandal
Secrets and Lies
The Shannara Chronicles
She Spies
The Sinner
Six Feet Under
The Son
The Sopranos
The Split
SS-GB
Still Star-Crossed
Switched at Birth
Taboo
Terminator: TSCC
Thirteen
Time After Time
Top of the Lake
Training Day
The Twilight Zone
Twisted
Unforgotten
Valor
The Vampire Diaries
War and Peace
The West Wing
Wisdom of the Crowd
Wolf Hall
The Young Pope

Reality/other 
America's Funniest Home Videos
America's Got Talent (moved to Colors Infinity)
Chef Vs Fridge
Candid Camera
Celebrity Family Feud
Celebrity Name Game
The Chefs' Line
The Cut
The David Letterman Show
Drop the Mic
The Ellen DeGeneres Show
Fameless
Family Food Fight
The Gong Show
Got to Dance
Just for Laughs: Gags
Keeping Up with the Kardashians
Live at the Apollo
Oliver's Twist
Splatalot!
Survivor: China
Top 20 Funniest
The Toy Box
Victoria's Secret Fashion Show
Wheel of Fortune UK
The X Factor
The Tonight Show with Jay Leno

Science Fiction 
The 100
11.22.63
Class
Colony (shared with Star World)
Counterpart
Journeyman
The Whispers

Sitcoms 
9JKL
18 to Life
Aliens in America
American Housewife
Back to You
Better with You
The Benny Hill Show
The Big Bang Theory (shared with Star World)
Caroline in the City 
Carol's Second Act
Cougar Town
Everybody Loves Raymond
Friends
Full House
The Great Indoors
Ground Floor
Happy Endings
Happy Together
Here's Lucy
The Hogan Family
I Dream of Jeannie
Joey
Just Shoot Me!
The King of Queens
Kevin from Work
Mad About You
Malibu Country
Melissa & Joey
The Middle
Mike & Molly
The Millers
Mind Your Language
Mixology
My Wife and Kids
The Odd Couple
Parks and Recreation
The Real O'Neals
Rules of Engagement
Seinfeld
Selfie
Three's Company
Trial & Error
Two and a Half Men
Unhitched
Will & Grace
Young and Hungry

Documentary 
Mayday
Zero Hour

See also
 List of Indian television stations
 Zee Network

References

External links
Zee Cafe Official website
Zee Network
Zee5

Television stations in Mumbai
English-language television stations in India
Television channels and stations established in 2000
Zee Entertainment Enterprises
2000 establishments in Maharashtra